The Dubliners is the eponymous debut album by the Irish folk band The Dubliners. A studio recording in front of a small invited audience, It was produced by Nathan Joseph and released by Transatlantic Records in 1964. The line-up consisted of Ronnie Drew, Barney McKenna, Luke Kelly and Ciarán Bourke.

The album is referred to on the back cover notes and has been reissued under the title The Dubliners with Luke Kelly as, by the time of its release, Luke had left the band. He rejoined in late 1965.

Track listing

Side One
 "The Wild Rover" - 3:13
 "The Ragman's Ball" - 2:08
 "Preab San Ól" - 2:14
 "The High Reel" - 2:58
 "The Holy Ground" - 2:15
 "Tramps and Hawkers" - 3:06
 "Home Boys, Home" - 3:17

Side Two
 "Rocky Road to Dublin" - 2:34
 "Banks of the Roses" - 2:12
 "I'll Tell My Ma" - 2:06
 "Swallow's Tail Reel" - 2:49
 "Jar of Porter" - 2:14
 "Love Is Pleasing" - 1:47
 "The Nightingale" - 3:35

Personnel
Ciarán Bourke - vocals, whistle
Ronnie Drew - vocals, guitar
Luke Kelly - vocals, 5-string banjo
Barney McKenna - tenor banjo

Mislabelled instrumental tracks 
The tune labelled "Swallow's Tail Reel" is a medley of "The Swallow's Tail" (O'Neill 536) and "The High Reel"
(O'Neill 721), from O'Neill's Dance Music of Ireland.

The tune labelled "The High Reel" is actually a medley of two different tunes. According to McKenna, the title of the first tune is "Códháirdeachais" (meaning "Congratulations" — this an old, pre-1948, spelling of the Irish word; the
current spelling would be "Comhghairdeas") and the title of the second is "The Boyne Hunt" (O'Neill 514, Willie Clancy 142). Several people have also noticed the resemblance of the first tune to the better-known "Sporting Nell".

References 

The Dubliners live albums
1964 debut albums
1964 live albums
Transatlantic Records live albums